Dawud Wharnsby (born David Howard Wharnsby; June 27, 1972) is a Canadian Universalist Muslim singer-songwriter, poet, performer, educator and television personality. A multi-instrumentalist, he is best known for his work in the musical/poetic genre of English Language nasheed and spoken word.

Early artistic career
Born in Kitchener, Ontario in 1972, David Wharnsby became active in local theatrical productions during his early teens, first performing on a world-class theater stage at the age of 18 in a production of "Jesus Christ Superstar" (Annas). Other stage work of his late teens included roles in "You're A Good Man Charlie Brown" (Schroeder) and "Rosencrantz & Guildenstern Are Dead".

At the age of 19, Wharnsby began performing throughout Southern Ontario as a solo musical artist and as a member of various musical groups. His first professional work as a musician was with folk quartet Crakenthorpe's Teapot, hired to perform on street corners of their hometown. Wharnsby travelled extensively throughout Ontario, England and Scotland during 1993 and 1994 as a solo busker – singing informally on street corners and in parks to market and share his music. In 1993, he started his own independent recording entity, Three Keyed Maple Seeds, which in 1996 was renamed Enter into Peace and registered with SOCAN as a music publishing entity.

During the early 1990s, Wharnsby worked as a professional actor and puppeteer for two different educational theater troupes, touring public schools and folk festivals throughout Ontario. At the age of 20, he played lead in a short educational film  "To Catch A Thief", distributed nationally in Canada to schools as part of the John Howard Society's anti-shoplifting program.

Music

In 1993, Dawud (David) Wharnsby and fellow Crackenthorpe's Teapot vocalist Heather Chappell began touring and performing as a duo, releasing an independent album (Off To Reap The Corn) containing renditions of traditional Canadian and Irish folk music.  The recording also featured Wharnsby's original lyrical adaptation of the traditional song "The Black Velvet Band".   His comical version "The Black Velvet Band as Never Before" is still sung in folk music circles.

Dawud has released several internationally distributed albums since 1995, including Blue Walls and the Big Sky, Vacuous Waxing (with Canadian writer Bill Kocher), A Different Drum (with The Fletcher Valve Drummers) and Out Seeing The Fields.  In the mid-1990s, Dawud began to work in the genre of English language nasheed (spiritual hymns of a folk/world-beat style, drawn from Qur'anic tradition). He has released over 10 popular albums of spiritual nasheed since 1993, including A Whisper of Peace, Colours of Islam, Road to Madinah and Sunshine Dust and the Messenger, all released through US based media company Sound Vision.Com.

September 3, 2007 Dawud released "Out Seeing the Fields" composed of 12 tracks, co-produced with LA based pianist Idris Phillips. The 11th track of the album named "Rachel" is a tribute to Rachel Corrie who was killed by an Israel Defense Forces (IDF) Caterpillar D9R armoured bulldozer, during an ISM protest against the destruction of Palestinian homes by the IDF in the Gaza Strip.

During his career Dawud has collaborated with Stephen Fearing, Irshad Khan, Danny Thompson, Yusuf Islam (aka Cat Stevens), Zain Bhikha, Idris Phillips, Hadiqa Kiani and Atif Aslam.

Television, video and radio production
As a television personality, Dawud has hosted programs produced in conjunction with Canada's Vision TV, the National Film Board of Canada, Al Huda TV (Saudi Arabia) and BBC Scotland.

Educational efforts

In honour of author, screenwriter and lecturer Rod Serling, Wharnsby (inspired as a child by Serlings' work) is also a supporter of the Rod Serling Memorial Foundation and contributor to The Foundation's scholarship fund.

Dawud Wharnsby was declared an Ambassador of Scouting by the Scout Association in the UK as of June 2010.

Personal life
In 1993, David Howard Wharnsby embraced the teachings of the Qur'an changing his name to "Dawud" (Arabic: داوود) – the Arabic form of "David" – and added the name "Ali" (Arabic: علي) to his surname. The name "Ali" was dropped from professional use in 2003, but remains a part of his legal name.   Wharnsby has identified himself as a Muslim since 1993 and also adheres to the principles of Unitarian Universalism.

Married in 2003, Dawud Wharnsby, his wife and their two children reside seasonally in the state of Colorado, United States, Abbottabad, Pakistan and in Waterloo, Ontario, Canada.

Though family ties do exist, Dawud Wharnsby is not to be confused with film editor David Wharnsby, also a native of the Kitchener-Waterloo area.

In the media
Dawud Wharnsby was named in a November 21, 2008 article by The Sun, as being a primary influence in an alleged conversion to the religion of Islam by pop star Michael Jackson.  The article stated that Wharnsby and fellow musician Idris Phillips were "pals" of Michael Jackson and had talked to him  "about their beliefs, and how they thought they had become better people after they converted.". The article was subsequently run by major print and television media worldwide.

Following the death of Michael Jackson on June 25, 2009 the original Sun article resurfaced, intensifying rumours surrounding Jackson's religious affiliation and his alleged "conversion" to the religion of Islam through the counsel of Dawud Wharnsby and Idris Phillips. A June 26, 2009 public statement by Wharnsby, initially presented on his official website stated:
"For the record: Though our professional circles did cross-over slightly... I never had the honour or pleasure of meeting Michael Jackson personally, nor did we ever correspond on matters of our professions, personal lives or faiths."
On the topic of conversion, Wharnsby also stated:
"My approach to faith does not include concepts of "conversion/reversion" or "propagation", so the very idea that I would have even tried to "convert" Mr. Jackson (or anyone else for that matter) to my spiritual perspective, is silly."
In November 2009 Dawud Wharnsby's name was included in the category of "Entertainment and The Arts" on a list of the 500 Most Influential Muslims, compiled by The Royal Islamic Strategic Studies Centre (Jordan), and published with support of Georgetown University's Prince Alwaleed Bin Talal Center for Muslim-Christian Understanding. Wharnsby was also included on the follow up lists of 2010, 2011, 2012, 2013/2014, and 2014/2015.

Discography

Solo work

CD singles and EP releases

Selected collaborations

Narrative work

Music videos

Published work
Nasheed Artist (Books 4 Schools, UK, 2005) (author/co-illustrator)
For Whom The Troubadour Sings (Kube Publishing Ltd, UK, 2009) (author)
A Picnic of Poems in Allah's Green Garden (Kube Publishing Ltd, UK, 2011) (author)
Colours of Islam (Kube Publishing Ltd, UK, 2013) (author)
A Whisper of Peace (Kube Publishing Ltd, UK, 2014) (author)

Television and video appearances
As Salamu Alaikum! (Sound Vision, 2005) (Soundtrack and actor/puppeteer)
A New Life in a New Land (Milo Productions/University of Saskatoon/NFB, 2004) (Soundtrack and host)
BBC Schools – Watch Celebrations: Ramadan And Eid (BBC Scotland, 2003) (Host)
Sing, Children of The World (Sound Vision, 2002) (Host)
Stories Behind The Songs (Sound Vision, 2002) (Host)
Rhythm of Islam (Sound Vision, 2002) (Host)
Alif Is For Allah (Sound Vision, 2000) (Soundtrack and actor/puppeteer)
The Humble Muslim (Sound Vision, 1999) (Soundtrack and actor/puppeteer)
Ramadan Mubarak (Sound Vision, 1998) (Soundtrack and actor/puppeteer)
To Catch A Thief (John Howard Society of Canada, 1990) (Actor)

References

External links
 
 Official website
 Dawud Wharnsby Nasheeds | His poetry, works and songs
 Dawud Wharnsby Ali feat Atif Aslam Hum Mustafavi Hain 

1972 births
Living people
Canadian male singer-songwriters
Canadian singer-songwriters
Converts to Islam
Canadian Muslims
Canadian spoken word poets
Muslim poets
Performers of Islamic music
Canadian Unitarian Universalists
Canadian expatriates in Pakistan
Musicians from Kitchener, Ontario
Writers from Kitchener, Ontario
21st-century Canadian male singers